The Mehmet Bey Mosque, locally also known as Hagia Sophia, is a 15th-century Ottoman mosque in the city of Serres in northern Greece.

History 
The mosque was built by the eponymous Mehmet Bey in 1492/93. Mehmet was a son-in-law of Sultan Bayezid II, having married the princess Seldjuk Hatun. The couple lived in the city in the late 15th century and endowed it with several other buildings, none of which survive.

Despite being the oldest and largest of the city's surviving mosques, today the building is derelict and unused. It had ceased to function as a mosque sometime in the late 19th century, when it suffered extensive damage from the flooding of the nearby Agioi Anargyroi stream.

Architecture 
The mosque is built of carefully carved yellow limestone ashlar masonry, except for the domed parts, which are built of brick. It consists of a spacious square central prayer hall, topped by a single dome with a diameter of 14.58 m. Four smaller rooms covered by half-domes are arranged two each on the east and west sides of the central space, while the southern face features a pentagonal portico containing the mihrab. The main entrance is located on the northern wall, topped by the founder's dedicatory inscription and fronted by a portico comprising five arches supported by columns of white marble with exquisitely carved capitals. The central arch is topped by a semi-spherical dome, while the arches on either side are topped by funnel domes. Originally, all the domes of the mosque were roofed in lead, and the interior walls plastered, while travellers report that a beautiful garden surrounded the building.

The mosque was famed for its architecture and the beauty of its garden. The Ottoman chronicler Evliya Çelebi noted that:

See also 
 Islam in Greece
 List of former mosques in Greece
 List of mosques in Greece

References

External links 
 

Religious buildings and structures completed in 1493
15th-century mosques
Ottoman mosques in Greece
Buildings and structures in Serres
Former mosques in Greece
15th-century architecture in Greece
Mosque buildings with domes